is a Japanese animation studio founded in 1996 by former Tokyo Movie Shinsha staff.

Works

Television series

Original video animations

Films

See also
 Shuka
 Lapin Track
 Platinum Vision

Notes

References

External links
 

 
Japanese animation studios
Mass media companies established in 1996
Japanese companies established in 1996
Mitaka, Tokyo
Animation studios in Tokyo